Simonetta Moro (born December 31, 1970) is a fine artist and educator. Most well known for her drawings, prints, and paintings, and mapping interpretations, depicting flow of change, landmasses, depth of history, and psychological states or memory. Also gaining notoriety are the long landscape drawings, slowly scrolling in mechanical boxes built by her inventor father Giovanni Moro.

From getting the Fulbright Fellowship to participating in important schools like Yaddo and Skowhegan, Simonetta has led an auspicious life. She now repays that training by participating in influential exhibitions like Mapping Brooklyn, at BRIC; and contributing to popular books like You Are Here, NYC, and The Map as Art.

Born in northern Italy, reared in Portogruaro, Simonetta went to high school in Venice at the Accademia di Belle Arti di Venezia. She went on to earn a B.F.A. in Painting at Accademia di Belle Arti di Bologna, Italy, 1994 Magna cum laude. Then a year of printmaking at the International School of Graphic art in Florence on a full scholarship. She then went off to England to get a Master of Art Degree at Winchester School of Art, University of Southampton, with a studio in Barcelona Spain. She gained a Fulbright Fellowship in 1999 and went to the American Academy in Rome. Continuing in Britain, she earned her Ph.D in visual art at University of Central Lancashire in Preston UK. Further, Simonetta went to Skowhegan School of Painting and Sculpture, Skowhegan, Maine United StatesofAmerica; on a full scholarship, with Jim Hyde, Nari Ward, and Daniel Boshkov teaching.

Professional development 

Moving to New York City in 2003, she took a teaching position at The New School in Manhattan, and developed their art program. In 2010, she became the director of the PhD program at IDSVA, Institute for Doctoral Studies in the Visual Arts. 

She exhibits her artwork in commercial galleries and cultural institutions and is published in popular books and academic papers.

Artmaking 

Simonetta’s artmaking practice centers on painting and drawing, her subject matter has a focus on mapmaking; diagrams of experience or memory, psychogeographical layouts, and urbanality. There is quite a variety within that scope, including multi sheet layered drawing histories of places (as shown at BRIC), paintings from overhead of urban streets negotiated by pedestrians (made in LMCC residency downtown Manhattan), lithographs, etchings, and panoramic drawings of an outdoor scene so wide they have to be viewed on custom made machines for scrolling the drawing back and forth.

Education 
2003     PhD in Visual Art (studio/theory), University of Central Lancashire, Preston, UK
1996     M.A. European Fine Art, Winchester School of Art, University of Southampton, UK
1994     Diploma in Pittura, 110/110 cum laude, Accademia di Belle Arti, Bologna, Italy
1989	 High school, Venice, Italy

Selected awards 
2006     Swing Space – Lower Manhattan Cultural Council, New York, NY
2003     Skowhegan School of Painting and Sculpture, Skowhegan, ME
2003     Yaddo Art Colony, Saratoga Springs, NY
1999-2000     Fulbright Fellowship in Visual Arts, American Academy in Rome, Italy

Selected exhibitions 
2008     Conflux Festival – Center for Architecture, New York
2008     “The Other Drawings” Directions Gallery, Colorado State University , Fort Collins, CO
2008     “An Abbecedarium For Our Times” – Apex Art, New York
2008     “Emotional Geographies”, SACI Gallery, Florence, Italy (solo)
2007-08     “Mapping the Self”, Museum of Contemporary Art, Chicago
2006     Galleria Altri Lavori in Corso, Rome, Italy
2005     “Unrecorded Unreckoned Between Thick Walls,” Gallery at Marmara, New York (solo)
2003-04     "Outside/in", Wooster Arts Space, New York

References

Italian artists
Living people
1970 births
Fulbright alumni
Skowhegan School of Painting and Sculpture alumni
Accademia di Belle Arti di Bologna alumni
Alumni of the University of Southampton